Luís Filipe Madeira Caeiro Figo  (born 4 November 1972) is a Portuguese former professional footballer who played as a winger for Sporting CP, Barcelona, Real Madrid and Inter Milan. He won 127 caps for the Portugal national team, a one-time record that has since been bettered by Pepe, Cristiano Ronaldo and João Moutinho. Renowned for his creativity and ability to get past defenders as a winger, he is widely regarded as one of the greatest players of all time.

His 106 assists are the second-most in La Liga history, behind Lionel Messi. He won the 2000 Ballon d'Or, 2001 FIFA World Player of the Year, and in 2004 Pelé named him in the FIFA 100 list of the world's greatest living players. Figo is one of the few football players to have played for both Spanish rival clubs Barcelona and Real Madrid. His controversial transfer in 2000 from Barcelona to Real Madrid set a world record fee of €62 million.

Figo had a successful career highlighted by several trophy wins, including the Portuguese Cup, four La Liga titles, two Spanish Cups, three Spanish Super Cups, one UEFA Champions League title, one UEFA Cup Winners' Cup, two UEFA Super Cups, one Intercontinental Cup, four Serie A titles, one Italian Cup and three Italian Super Cups. At international level, he scored 32 goals for Portugal, representing the nation at three European Championships and two World Cups, helping them reach the final but finish as runners-up at Euro 2004, as well as reaching the semi-finals at the 2006 World Cup.

Early years
The only child of António Caeiro Figo and Maria Joana Pestana Madeira who moved from Alentejo to Lisbon in the early 1970s, Figo grew up in the working-class district of Cova da Piedade, Almada. He began his career as a street footballer at U.F.C. Os Pastilhas, before joining the academy of Sporting Clube de Portugal at the age of 12. In his youth, Figo played futsal from which he learned a lot of skills that helped him later in his career.

Club career

Sporting CP
Figo started his career at Sporting CP, making his league debut on 1 April 1990 during the 1989–90 season as a substitute for Marlon Brandão in a 1–0 home win against Marítimo. On 7 December 2021, Figo scored his first goal against Torreense in the 1991–92 season, equalising as Sporting won 2–1. He won his first senior international cap in 1991. Prior to that, he won the 1991 FIFA Under-20 World Championships and Under-16 European Championships with Portugal junior sides alongside Rui Costa and João Pinto. He was also a significant part of Portugal's "Golden Generation". In his final season at Sporting he won the 1994–95 Portuguese Cup.

Barcelona
In 1995, Figo looked poised to join one of the big clubs of Europe, but a dispute between Italian clubs Juventus and Parma, with Figo having signed contracts with both clubs, resulted in an Italian two-year transfer ban on him. Eventually, Figo made a move to Spanish giants Barcelona for a £2.25 million fee, being loaned back for the remainder of the season due to a rule prohibiting Portuguese players from signing for foreign clubs outside a fixed period. This rule had prevented Figo from joining English club Manchester City, where he had been recommended by his former Sporting manager Malcolm Allison for a fee of around £1.2 million.

It was with Barcelona that Figo's career really took off, winning the 1996–97 UEFA Cup Winners' Cup, starring alongside Ronaldo, followed by successive Primera División titles where he was part of a formidable attack that included Rivaldo and Patrick Kluivert. In total, Figo appeared 172 times in the league for Barcelona, scoring 30 goals. He was revered in Barcelona because his presence had given Catalonia a sense of external approval.

Real Madrid

In July 2000, Figo made a surprising and controversial €62 million move to Barcelona's bitter rivals Real Madrid. Real Madrid met the buyout clause in Figo's contract at Barcelona, a new world record fee, and his arrival at Madrid signalled the beginning of Florentino Pérez's Galáctico era of global stars signed by the club every year. Figo became the new focus of the Barcelona–Real Madrid rivalry, with Barcelona fans feeling betrayed by his transfer and turning against him. His move to Madrid was significant due to his status as a star player at Barcelona, reliable, and always committed to the cause as a team leader. One of his Barcelona teammates stated, "Our plan was simple: give the ball to Luís. He never, ever hid". Although now wearing the white shirt of Real Madrid, he won the Ballon d'Or award in November 2000, largely for what he did for Barcelona, where he became the best in the world. 

When Figo returned to Barcelona for the first time in a Real Madrid shirt on 21 October 2000, the noise at Camp Nou was deafening. There were banners hung around the stadium with words like "Traitor", "Judas", "Scum", and "Mercenary". Figo was mercilessly taunted throughout, and when he came out of the tunnel and ran onto the field the jeers of almost 98,000 Barcelona fans escalated, with a visibly shocked Figo putting his fingers to his ears. When El Clásico started, each time Figo got the ball the noise rose with insults and missiles flying such as oranges, bottles, cigarette lighters and mobile phones. The regular corner taker for Madrid, Figo did not take any corners at the Camp Nou to avoid being in close proximity to the fans. Barcelona were victorious, winning 2–0, and Real Madrid President Florentino Pérez stated after the match, "The atmosphere got to us all." Madrid defender Iván Campo commented,

In his first season with Madrid, Figo won the 2001 La Liga title, scoring 14 goals in all competitions. For his performances at Real, he was designated the 2001 FIFA World Player of the Year. He would be joined at the club by Zinedine Zidane in the middle of 2001, and in the following season Madrid won the 2001–02 UEFA Champions League. He missed two fixtures against Barcelona through injury and suspension.

Figo's second game back at the Camp Nou, on 23 November 2002, produced one of the defining images of the Barcelona–Real Madrid rivalry. There was no sign of the hatred or the hurt subsiding, and every time he came within range of the Barcelona fans, beer cans, lighters, bottles and golf balls flew. Figo commented, "I was worried that some madman might lose his head." This time, Figo had decided that he would take corners, as well as throw-ins, and midway through the second half Madrid won a corner. Amid a shower of flying objects, it took Figo two minutes to take it. Another corner followed on the other side, and as Figo walked across, he slowed to pick up the missiles and as he prepared to take the corner he moved away some of the debris while giving an ironic thumbs-up and smiling. Every time he began his run-up to take the corner, another missile would land which was repeated over and over, until the referee Luis Medina Cantalejo suspended the game for almost 20 minutes. During the break in play, the defining image of the rivalry, a pig's head, was picked up on camera, which was in among the debris near the corner flag.

Figo would spend five seasons at Madrid, with his final success being the 2003 La Liga title. In April 2013, Figo was named by the sports newspaper Marca as a member of the "Best foreign eleven in Real Madrid's history".

Inter Milan

Figo left Real Madrid to join the Italian club Inter Milan in the middle of 2005 on a free transfer after his contract with Madrid had expired. This meant that Figo would finally be able to play for a club in Italy, something he had the chance to do before his move to Barcelona, but was scuppered due to a dispute between the two clubs interested, Juventus and Parma. During the middle of 2008, Figo's compatriot José Mourinho joined Inter as manager. This has been said to please Figo, as he would have several Portuguese teammates during the remainder of his stay at Inter. On 16 May 2009, Figo announced his retirement from football, the same day Inter won the 2008–09 title, and re-confirmed this on 30 May; his final game was on 31 May against Atalanta at the San Siro. At Javier Zanetti's insistence, Figo captained the side for his last match. He received a standing ovation from the crowd as he was substituted by Davide Santon. The free-kick he scored in extra time against Roma during the Supercoppa Italiana was his most memorable moment in Italy.

Figo said, "I am leaving football, not Inter." He was interviewed by Inter Channel after his last game against Atalanta and also said, "I hope to be able to help this club to become even greater also after my retirement. I will certainly work for Inter in the future on the club board. I never imagined that I was going to remain here for such a long time. What I will never forget is the love that I have received since my first day here from my teammates and president Massimo Moratti. I will never forget it; Inter has given me the chance to start a winning cycle with some extraordinary people." Figo was on the sidelines when Inter won the 2009–10 UEFA Champions League on 22 May 2010.

International career

Early international career

The leader of Portugal's "Golden Generation", Figo won a FIFA World Youth Championship in 1991, the same year he made his senior debut against Luxembourg on 16 October 1991, in a friendly match that ended 1–1 when he was only 18 years old. His first goal equalised in a 2–1 friendly victory over Bulgaria in Paris on 11 November 1992. Figo scored three goals in eight qualifying games for UEFA Euro 1996, as his country reached the continental tournament for the first time in 12 years. In the final group game at the tournament, against Croatia at the City Ground in Nottingham, Figo opened a 3–0 victory with a fourth-minute strike; the result sent Portugal into the quarter-finals as group winners ahead of their opponents.

Euro 2000 and 2002 World Cup
Figo featured in all ten of Portugal's qualifiers for the next European Championship, scoring three times in the process. On 12 June 2000, in their opening game of the tournament in Eindhoven, he scored Portugal's first goal as they came from behind to beat England 3–2, again advancing as group winners to be eliminated in the semi-finals. He was rested by Humberto Coelho for the final group match against Germany in Rotterdam, breaking a chain of 32 consecutive international appearances. His only hat-trick for the national team came on 15 August 2001, when he netted all of the goals in a 3–0 friendly victory over Moldova at the Estádio de São Luís in Faro.

With six goals in nine matches, Figo helped Portugal qualify for the 2002 FIFA World Cup; on 2 June 2001, in the qualifier against the Republic of Ireland at Lansdowne Road, he served as captain for the first time on his 74th cap and scored the equaliser for a 1–1 draw. In their first World Cup since 1986, Portugal suffered group stage elimination while Figo failed to score a goal.

Euro 2004 and 2006 World Cup
On 18 February 2004, Figo earned his 100th cap in a 1–1 friendly draw with England at the Estádio Algarve, playing as captain despite regular skipper Fernando Couto being in the starting line-up. Later that year at the European Championship on home soil, he captained the side after Couto was dropped. He announced his retirement from international football following the Euro 2004 final upset-defeat by Greece due to an alleged rift between him and national coach Luiz Felipe Scolari, although this was denied. In June 2005, he reversed his decision and returned for the 2006 World Cup qualifying wins against Slovakia and Estonia under Scolari.

Figo captained the squad during the 2006 World Cup, leading the team to the semi-finals. With three wins, Portugal finished top of their group and qualified for the knock-out rounds with Mexico. They advanced past the Netherlands in the last 16, and defeated England on penalties in the quarter-final. Figo did not take part in the shootout, having been substituted for Hélder Postiga. In the semi-final, Portugal was beaten by France courtesy of a penalty from his former club-mate and French captain Zinedine Zidane. This was Portugal's best finish in 40 years. The third-place playoff caused some controversy as Figo did not start; Pauleta captained the team in his place. However, Portugal fell behind 2–0 to hosts Germany and Figo replaced Pauleta in the 77th minute, who handed him back the captain's armband to cheers from both Portuguese and German fans. Although Germany scored another goal shortly after Figo's entrance, he ended his final cap for his country on a high note by setting up Nuno Gomes to head in an 88th-minute consolation goal, thus passing his number 7 jersey down to his successor, Cristiano Ronaldo.

Despite having no trophies to show for the "Golden Generation", Figo managed to captain the team to their best World Cup performance since the Eusébio era in 1966, as well as helping Portugal to their best-ever result in the UEFA European Championship until they won it in 2016. He finished his international career with 127 caps and scoring 32 goals, and held the record until June 2016 for most appearances with the Portugal national team; he is also Portugal's fourth-highest all-time goalscorer.

Style of play
Figo is regarded as one of the greatest players of all time, and one of the greatest Portuguese players of all time. At his physical peak, Figo was a quick, agile, physically strong, elegant, highly skillful player with close ball control, fluidity, grace, acceleration, agility, quick feet, balance, flair and a dribbling ability that allowed him to frequently take on and beat defenders in one on one situations. He would often employ feints or tricks to beat opponents, such as stepovers. Technically one of the most accomplished players of all time, he possessed an excellent first touch.  Although naturally right-footed, he was capable of striking with either foot. Figo was usually deployed as a winger in his early career, where he was capable of providing several assists, due to his ability to provide curling crosses to teammates from the right flank, or cut inside, drift onto the left, or link-up with midfielders, and create goalscoring opportunities. He has made the second-most assists in La Liga history behind Lionel Messi.

As he lost speed and mobility with age as his career advanced, he was deployed in a playmaking role as an attacking midfielder, in particular during his time with Inter, where he excelled with his vision, intelligence and varied passing ability. Although he primarily served as a creative player, he was also capable of contributing offensively with goals due to his powerful striking ability from distance, as well as his accuracy from free-kicks and penalties. In addition to his football ability, Figo was also highly regarded for his leadership throughout his career.

Media

Figo has appeared in commercials for the sportswear company Nike. In 1996, he starred in a Nike commercial titled "Good vs Evil" in a gladiatorial game set in a Roman amphitheatre. Appearing alongside football players from around the world, including Ronaldo, Paolo Maldini, Ian Wright, Eric Cantona, Patrick Kluivert and Jorge Campos, they defend "the beautiful game" against a team of demonic warriors, before it culminates with Cantona striking the ball and destroying evil.

In a global Nike advertising campaign in the run-up to the 2002 World Cup in Korea and Japan, Figo starred in a "Secret Tournament" commercial (branded by Nike as "Scorpion KO") directed by Terry Gilliam, appearing alongside football players such as Thierry Henry, Ronaldinho, Francesco Totti, Roberto Carlos and Japanese star Hidetoshi Nakata, with former player Eric Cantona the tournament "referee".

Figo features in EA Sports' FIFA video game series; he was named in the Ultimate Team Legends in FIFA 14. In 2015, the arcade game company Konami announced that Figo would feature in their football video game Pro Evolution Soccer 2016 as one of the new myClub Legends. In 2018, Figo was added as an icon to the Ultimate Team in FIFA 19.

He has also taken part in several Iranian television shows such as Navad TV during the 2018 World Cup draw, together with Hamid Estili and former Hamburg player Mehdi Mahdavikia.

In August 2022, Netflix launched El Caso Figo (The Figo Affair), a documentary about Figo's transfer from Barcelona to Real Madrid.

FIFA presidency campaign
On 28 January 2015, Figo announced his intention to run against incumbent Sepp Blatter for the position of FIFA president. His endorsers included José Mourinho and David Beckham. In his manifesto, Figo mentioned his support for expanding the World Cup to 48-team finals tournaments, and promised greater investment in grassroots football and national federations. Considered an outsider compared to Blatter and the other two candidates – Michael van Praag and Prince Ali bin Hussein – Figo withdrew from the election campaign on 21 May, stating that he did not want to be given "absolute power".

Personal life

Figo is married to Swedish model Helen Svedin. They have three daughters – Daniela (born in 1999), Martina (born in 2002), and Stella (born in 2004).

Along with his countryman, former Portugal national team manager and former youth team coach Carlos Queiroz, Figo was briefly joint seat holder for A1 Team Portugal, in A1 Grand Prix, during the 2005–06 season. He owns an upscale bar in the Algarve region of Portugal.

Figo is an ambassador for the Stop TB Partnership in the fight against tuberculosis. He works closely with Inter Milan, serving as an ambassador for the club at functions across Europe. He is also a board member of the Inter Campus charity project run by Inter Milan.

Figo is the founder of Network90, a private members' networking site for the Professional Football Industry. Figo is fluent in five languages: Portuguese, Spanish, English, Italian and French. He has also congratulated his wife on her birthday on Instagram in Swedish, although he has never spoken the language in media appearances.

Career statistics

Club

International

Scores and results list Portugal's goal tally first, score column indicates score after each Figo goal.

Honours
Sporting CP
 Taça de Portugal: 1994–95

Barcelona
 La Liga: 1997–98, 1998–99
 Copa del Rey: 1996–97, 1997–98
 Supercopa de España: 1996
 UEFA Cup Winners' Cup: 1996–97
 UEFA Super Cup: 1997

Real Madrid
 La Liga: 2000–01, 2002–03
 Supercopa de España: 2001, 2003
 UEFA Champions League: 2001–02
 UEFA Super Cup: 2002
 Intercontinental Cup: 2002

Inter Milan
 Serie A: 2005–06, 2006–07, 2007–08, 2008–09
 Coppa Italia: 2005–06
 Supercoppa Italiana: 2006, 2008

Portugal
 UEFA European Championship runner-up: 2004
 UEFA European U-16 Championship: 1989
 FIFA World Youth Championship: 1991

Individual
 UEFA Under-21 Championship Golden Player: 1994
 Portuguese Golden Ball: 1994
 Sporting CP Player of the Year: 1994
 Portuguese Footballer of the Year: 1995, 1996, 1997, 1998, 1999, 2000
 ESM Team of the Year: 1997–98, 1999–00
 La Liga Foreign Player of the Year: 1999, 2000, 2001
Don Balón Award, Best Foreign Player of the Year: 1999
 UEFA European Championship Team of the Tournament: 2000, 2004
 World Soccer (magazine) Player of the Year: 2000
 Ballon d'Or: 2000
 FIFA World Player of the Year: 2001
 FIFA World Player of the Year – Silver Award: 2000
 UEFA Team of the Year: 2003
 UEFA Champions League top assist provider: 2004–05
 FIFA World Cup All-Star Team: 2006
 Inter Milan Player of the Year: 2006
 FIFA 100
 Golden Foot: 2011, as football legend
 IFFHS Legends

Orders
  Officer of the Order of Prince Henry
  Knight of the Order of the Immaculate Conception of Vila Viçosa (House of Braganza)

See also 
 List of footballers with 100 or more UEFA Champions League appearances
 List of men's footballers with 100 or more international caps

References

External links

 Luís Figo at Real Madrid
 
 
 

1972 births
Living people
Sportspeople from Almada
Portuguese footballers
Association football wingers
Sporting CP footballers
FC Barcelona players
Real Madrid CF players
Inter Milan players
Primeira Liga players
La Liga players
Serie A players
UEFA Champions League winning players
Portugal youth international footballers
Portugal under-21 international footballers
Portugal international footballers
UEFA Euro 1996 players
UEFA Euro 2000 players
2002 FIFA World Cup players
UEFA Euro 2004 players
2006 FIFA World Cup players
FIFA Century Club
Ballon d'Or winners
FIFA World Player of the Year winners
FIFA 100
World Soccer Magazine World Player of the Year winners
Golden Globes (Portugal) winners
Portuguese expatriate footballers
Portuguese expatriate sportspeople in Spain
Portuguese expatriate sportspeople in Italy
Expatriate footballers in Spain
Expatriate footballers in Italy
Officers of the Order of Prince Henry
A1 Grand Prix team owners